Tell Me Why may refer to:

Books 
 Tell Me Why (magazine), a British children's magazine relaunched as World of Wonder
 Tell Me Why, a 2009 book by Eric Walters

Music

Albums
 Tell Me Why (Archie Roach album), 2019
 Tell Me Why (Bobby Vinton album), 1964, or the title song
 Tell Me Why (Jann Browne album), 1990, or the title song
 Tell Me Why (Wynonna Judd album) 1993, or the title song
 Tell Me Why, a 2002 EP and its title song by Pocket Venus

Songs
 "Tell Me Why" (1951 song), song written by Al Alberts and Marty Gold, popularized by The Four Aces and by Eddie Fisher
 "Tell Me Why" (1956 song), song written by Titus Turner, popularized by Marie Knight, and later by Elvis Presley
 "Tell Me Why" (Beatles song), 1964
 "Tell Me Why" (Declan Galbraith song), 2002
 "Tell Me Why" (Earl Thomas Conley song), 1981
 "Tell Me Why" (Echobelly song)
 "Tell Me Why" (Exposé song), 1989
 "Tell Me Why" (Genesis song), 1991
 "Tell Me Why" (Jann Browne song), 1990
 "Tell Me Why" (John Holt song), 1974. Covered by Musical Youth in 1983
 "Tell Me Why" (M.I.A. song), 2010
 "Tell Me Why" (Monica Anghel and Marcel Pavel song), 2002
 "Tell Me Why" (Neil Young song), 1970
 "Tell Me Why" (Spice Girls song), 2000
 "Tell Me Why" (Supermode song), 2006
 "Tell Me Why" (Wah Wah Collective song), 2013
 "Tell Me Why" (Wynonna Judd song), 1993
 "Tell Me Why (The Riddle)", a 2000 song by Paul van Dyk and Saint Etienne
 "Tell Me Why", by the Bee Gees from 2 Years On
 "Tell Me Why", by Berlin from Pleasure Victim
 "Tell Me Why", by Eddie Cochran from Singin' to My Baby, adapted from
 "Tell Me Why", written by Mitchell Parish, Michael Edwards, and Sigmund Spaeth, adapted from
 "Tell Me Why", composed by Roy L. Burtch, lyrics by Fred Mower, c. 1899
 "Tell Me Why", by Gorky Park from Moscow Calling
 "Tell Me Why", by John Cale from Walking on Locusts
 "Tell Me Why", by Jonas Brothers from the TV series Jonas
 "Tell Me Why", by The Kid Laroi from F*ck Love
 "Tell Me Why", by Musical Youth
 "Tell Me Why", by Norman Fox & The Rob-Roys, and covered in 1961 by Dion and the Belmonts
 "Tell Me Why", by the Penpals from Berserk
 "Tell Me Why", by P.O.D. from When Angels & Serpents Dance
 "Tell Me Why", by Prezioso & Marvin
 "Tell Me Why", by Taylor Swift from Fearless
 "Tell Me Why", by Three Days Grace from Human
 "Tell Me Why", by Will Smith featuring Mary J. Blige from Smith's album Lost and Found
 "Tell Me Why", from the musical A Man of No Importance

Others
 Tell Me Why (video game), a video game by Dontnod Entertainment

See also
 Tell Me (disambiguation)